The Drexel University College of Computing & Informatics (CCI), formerly the College of Information Science and Technology or iSchool, is one of the primary colleges of Drexel University in Philadelphia, Pennsylvania.  The College of Computing & Informatics has faculty and administrative offices, research laboratories, collaborative learning spaces, and classrooms at 3675 Market Street (University City Campus). Its current dean is Yi Deng. 

CCI was formed in September 2013 by merging the former College of Information Science and Technology (iSchool), the Department of Computer Science, and the Department of Computing and Security Technology. It is part of the iSchools Caucus and the former College of Information Science and Technology  was one of the three founding members of the iSchool Caucus.

History
CCI was created in 2013 as a result of merging the former College of Information Science and Technology (iSchool), the Department of Computer Science, and the Department of Computing and Security Technology. Details regarding the history of the iSchool is below:

College of Information Science and Technology (iSchool)
 College of Computing and Informatics ( 2013–Present)
 1995-2013   College of Information Science and Technology 
 1985-1995   College of Information Studies
 1979-1985   School of Library and Information Science
 1942-1979   Graduate School of Library Science
 1922-1942   School of Library Science
 1900-1914   Library School
 1893-1900   Library Dept.
 1892-1893   Library and Reading Room

Programs

Undergraduate
The College of Computing & Informatics offers six undergraduate programs: the Bachelor of Science in Information Systems (BSIS), Data Science (BSDS), Information Technology (BSIT), Software Engineering (BSSE), Computing and Security Technology, Computer Science (CS), and the BS/MS Accelerated Degree Program which allows students to complete both a bachelor's degree and a master's degree in five years. Most of the undergraduates take advantage of Drexel's long-standing co-op program to get real-world work experience before graduation.

The college also has a Peer Mentor program through which incoming undergraduate students are assigned mentors who are current students in CCI programs. Any student who fits the criteria can apply to be a Peer Mentor after their first year and be interviewed for selection.

Graduate
The college offers master's programs including the Master of Science in Information with majors in Library and Information Science and Human-Computer Interaction and User Experience, the Master of Science in Data Science (MSDS), the Master of Science in Information Systems (MSIS), the Master of Science in Software Engineering (MSSE), the Master of Science in Computer Science (MSCS), the Master of Science in Artificial Intelligence & Machine Learning (MSAIML), the online Master of Science in Health Informatics (MSHI), and a joint program with the Electrical & Computer Engineering Department of Drexel's College of Engineering, the Master of Science in Cybersecurity (MSC). Apart from these specialized programs, a dual degree (MS/MSIS) in Master of Science in Library and Information Science (MS) and Master of Science in Information Systems (MSIS) is also offered. The college also awards PhD degrees in Information Science and Computer Science, and offers various certificate programs for Professional Development.

Special programs
The former iSchool hosted the Pennsylvania Governor's School for Information, Society and Technology (PGSIST) from 1998 until 2008, at which time the PGSIST was canceled due to statewide budget cuts. The program included a full scholarship summer enrichment program which was committed to meeting the educational needs of academically talented high school students through a five-week-long on college campus program.

Developed jointly by the former iSchool and the Computer Science Department, Drexel now hosts the Drexel University Computing Academy (DUCA). DUCA is a five-week program that allows high school sophomores and juniors  with an interest in the computer field to not only learn about various topics in computing, but also to work on group projects, experience a university environment by living on campus, and participate in various activities in and around Philadelphia.

Rankings
In 2007, the College ranked 5th nationally for specialized programs in information systems, 6th nationally for specialized programs in digital librarianship. Overall the library and information science program was ranked 11th for Library and Information Studies Specialties.

In 2009, U.S. News & World Report ranked The iSchool, College of Information Science and Technology's library and information science graduate program 9th for Library and Information Studies Specialties.

In 2013, U.S. News & World Report ranked The iSchool, College of Information Science and Technology's library and information science graduate program 10th in the nation for Library Science master's programs as part of the 2014 "America's Best Graduate Schools" edition.

The College was also ranked by U.S. News & World Report in 2013 in the following specialties: Health Librarianship (#1), Information Systems (#3), Digital Librarianship (#6), Services for Children and Youth (#9), School Library Media (#10), and Archives and Preservation (#12).

In 2019 the school was ranked in the top 25 STEM schools in the US by Forbes. 

In 2020 Cyber Degrees ranked the school as having the number 1 online undergraduate Cybersecurity degree program in the US.

In 2020 the school was ranked in the top 5 schools in the US for Information Science degrees by College Factual.

In 2019 the school was ranked in the top 20 in the US for Online Graduate Computer Information Technology Programs by U.S.News & World Report.

In 2018 the school was ranked in the top 10 in the US for Best Online Colleges for Master's in Library Science by The Guide to Online Schools/SR Education Group.

Facilities
The College's former facilities include the Rush Building at the corner of 33rd Street and Lancaster Avenue. Constructed in 1904, the Hospital for the Treatment of Consumption and Related Diseases was named after Benjamin Rush, the famous 18th-century Philadelphia physician and one of the signers of the Declaration of Independence. In 1961, Drexel University acquired the building to in part house its Graduate School of Library Science.

From 1978 to 1981, the Rush Building was renovated for sole use by the library and information science programs. The project cost $2.4 million, $1 million of which came from a Pew Charitable Trusts grant. In 2006 the lobby was renovated and the Alumni Garden was expanded. In 2008, the Computing Resource Center (computer lab for use exclusively by IST students) was remodeled and renamed the iCommons.

In April 2019 the college consolidated facilities for faculty, staff, and students, moving into leased space in uCity Square, a complex of buildings in University City. State of the art offices and classrooms dedicated to the College of Computing & Informatics occupied two floors of the building at 3675 Market Street. On May 2nd, 2019, a ribbon cutting ceremony was held to officially open the space. In September 2019, a third floor opened with the DXC Technology Innovation Lab, a maker space, a research lab, and additional offices and classrooms for faculty and students. Currently the 9th, 10th, and 11th floors are occupied by CCI. Students have access to the high-quality workspaces which are provided and operated by CIC. Furthermore, students have access to a cafe on the 1st floor of 3675 Market Street and The Quorum, a conference space.

References

Drexel University Computing Academy

Drexel University
Computer science departments in the United States
Information schools
2013 establishments in Pennsylvania